Nudge or Nudging may refer to:

Arts
 Nudge (band), an American electronic rock band
 Nudge, a character from the Maximum Ride series by James Patterson
 "Nudge Nudge", a sketch from the third Monty Python's Flying Circus
 Gerald "Nudge" Noritis, a character from the Australian sitcom Hey Dad..!

Psychology
 Nudge (book), a book on choice architecture by Richard Thaler and Cass R. Sunstein
 Nudge theory, a psychological theory on influencing individuals and groups to take action without force

Science and technology
 Nudge (instant messaging), an attention-getting feature in instant messaging software
 Nudging, a data assimilation method also known as Newtonian relaxation

Model railways
 Nudging, a discrete push or prod which brings station canopies and other railway structures out of alignment. Originally used to describe an unintentional action, now also describes intentional covert action.

Other
 "The Nudge", a nickname for rock star Ted Nugent
 "Nudge Unit", a nickname for the Behavioural Insights Team